North Durham is a constituency represented in the House of Commons of the UK Parliament since 2001 by Kevan Jones of the Labour Party.

History
A constituency formally named the Northern Division of Durham was created by the Great Reform Act for the 1832 general election, when the former Durham constituency was split into the northern and southern divisions, each electing two members using the bloc vote system. 

This seat was abolished by the Redistribution of Seats Act 1885 when the two divisions were replaced by eight single-member divisions.These were Barnard Castle, Bishop Auckland, Chester-le-Street, Houghton-le-Spring, Jarrow, Mid Durham, North West Durham and South East Durham.  In addition there were seven County Durham borough constituencies.

The seat was re-created as a single-seat constituency for the 1983 general election as a result of the redistribution following the changes to local authority boundaries under the Local Government Act 1972. The new constituency comprised those parts of the abolished Chester-le-Street constituency retained within the reconstituted county of Durham, together with those parts of the abolished Consett constituency which had comprised the urban district of Stanley.

Boundaries

1832–1885 
 The Wards of Chester and Easington, with a place of election at Durham. 

See map on Vision of Britain website.

Included non-resident 40 shilling freeholders in the parliamentary boroughs of Durham, Gateshead, South Shields and Sunderland.

1983–1997 

 The District of Chester-le-Street; and 
 the District of Derwentside wards of Annfield Plain, Burnopfield, Catchgate, Craghead, Dipton, Havannah, South Moor, South Stanley, Stanley Hall, and Tanfield.

1997–2010 

 The District of Chester-le-Street; and 
 the District of Derwentside wards of Annfield Plain, Catchgate, Craghead, Havannah, South Moor, South Stanley, Stanley Hall, and Tanfield.

Burnopfield and Dipton wards were transferred to the redrawn North West Durham.

2010–present 

 The District of Chester-le-Street; and 
 the District of Derwentside wards of Annfield Plain, Catchgate, Craghead and South Stanley, Havannah, South Moor, Stanley Hall, and Tanfield.

The 1997 boundaries were retained despite the official description of the constituency changing slightly in terms of the names of the local authority wards.

The constituency spans the north of County Durham in North East England. It includes the whole of the former Chester-le-Street district and the eastern part of the former Derwentside district. The main population centres (large settlements) are Chester-le-Street, Stanley and Sacriston. The constituency includes the North of England Open Air Museum at Beamish.

Members of Parliament

MPs 1832–1885

MPs since 1983

Elections

Elections in the 2010s

Elections in the 2000s

Elections in the 1990s

Elections in the 1980s

Elections in the 1880s

Elections in the 1870s

  
 

 Caused by the 1874 election being declared void on petition.

Elections in the 1860s

 
 
 

 
 
 

 

 Caused by Vane-Tempest's death.

Elections in the 1850s
 
 
 

 
 
 

 
 

 Caused by Vane-Tempest's succession to the peerage, becoming Earl Vane

Elections in the 1840s

Elections in the 1830s

See also
List of parliamentary constituencies in County Durham
History of parliamentary constituencies and boundaries in Durham

Notes

References

Parliamentary constituencies in County Durham
Constituencies of the Parliament of the United Kingdom established in 1832
Constituencies of the Parliament of the United Kingdom disestablished in 1885
Constituencies of the Parliament of the United Kingdom established in 1983